Touchwood Lake is a lake in the Hayes River drainage basin in Census Division No. 22 - Thompson-North Central, Northern Region, Manitoba, Canada. The primary inflows (clockwise from the northwest) are the Mink River, Wanless Creek, and the Wapawukaw River, and the primary outflow is a channel to Vermilyea Lake. The lake's waters eventually flow into Gods Lake, and via the Gods River and the Hayes River into Hudson Bay.

References

Lakes of Manitoba